Neues aus Büttenwarder is a German TV Series which aired from 1997 to 2021 and was created by Norbert Eberlein. The comedy series with Jan Fedder and Peter Heinrich Brix portrays events in the fictional village of  Büttenwarder in Schleswig-Holstein. Fedder died of cancer in 2019. After his death, three more episodes were filmed, after which the series was discontinued in 2021.

Plot 
The two main characters are played by Jan Fedder (Kurt Brakelmann; until 2019) and Peter Heinrich Brix (Arthur „Adsche“ Tönnsen). Both were previously well known from the TV series Großstadtrevier. Further characters are played by Günter Kütemeyer (as Mayor Dr. Waldemar Schönbiehl; until 2015), Axel Olsson (as pub landlord Shorty) and Sven Walser (as stable boy Kuno).

The series is filmed in the Stormarn district of Schleswig-Holstein and in the local area. The pub which features heavily in the series – Unter den Linden (also known as Dorfkrug) – is in Grönwohld. When the pub is not being used for filming it is open to the public and also serves ‘’Lütt un Lütt’’ (direct translation ‘’Small and Small’’ – a beer and a schnapps) which is a much loved (and often mentioned) drink in the series.

The 25 minute long episodes are usually concerned with the friendship between Brakelmann and Adsche who often try to outdo each other usually in the pursuit of quick money making opportunities. However, the friends always support each other in difficult situations.

Cast

Episodes 

The episodes are recorded in German and are dubbed in Plattdüütsch in the studio by the same actors at a later date. The episodes are usually first aired in German and then in Plattdüütsch at a later date.

Documentaries and Specials

TV and DVD 

The first episode UFOs über Büttenwarder was aired on 26 December 1997 on NDR. Two further episodes were shown on 26 December 1999 (Liebesnacht in Büttenwarder and  Wahlkampf in Büttenwarder). In 2001 these episodes were integration in the first full series of Neues aus Büttenwarder.

The first 8 episodes were shown weekly on Tuesday evening from 16 January 2001 on  ARD. Further episodes were aired at irregular interval from 2004. The series was initially not deemed popular enough to be aired as a regular series in the primetime TV viewing slots (9:05pm) on ARD. However, repeats on NDR proved very popular.

As of January 2014, 55 episode of Neues aus Büttenwarder have been filmed. The latest episodes were aired over Christmas 2013.

The first 47 episodes are available on DVD. Both the German and Plattdüütsch versions are available on all DVDs as well as special and bonus features.

All episodes made since 2011 are also available with Audio description.

Talent Search 

At the beginning of 2010 NDR ran a casting call in which fans of the show could upload videos of their unique talents onto YouTube. Over 330 videos were uploaded and the 20 best were voted on by a jury. After voting was completed the final 5 candidates were invited to a final casting after which the winner was given a guest role in the series. The runner up for also given a guest role in the series although this was only announced when the winner was revealed.

15 Years of Neues aus Büttenwarder 

As part of the celebrations for the 15th anniversary of Neues aus Büttenwarder, a special cinema only compilation was shown in four north German towns. The episodes Schmerzensgeld, Guten Appetit and Schafwölkchen as well as parts of the documentary 15 Jahre – 15 Fragen (15 years – 15 questions) were shown.

Books 
 Norbert Eberlein, Ulfert Becker: Zu Besuch in Büttenwarder: Leute, Landschaft, Lütt & Lütt. edel-Verlag 2009, .
 Norbert Eberlein: Gedeck, doppelt! – Neues aus Büttenwarder. Rowohlt, Reinbek 2012, .
 Ulfert Becker: Wiedersehen in Büttenwarder: Mehr Leute, mehr Landschaft, noch mehr Lütt & Lütt. Edel-Verlag 2013, .

See also 
 List of German television series

References

External links 
 
 Series Homepage on the NDR website
 Report on how the series is dubbed in Plattdeutsch
 Neues vom Team
 Büttenwarder YouTube Channel

Norddeutscher Rundfunk
1997 German television series debuts
2000s German television series
2010s German television series
German comedy television series
German-language television shows
Das Erste original programming